Jacoby Fleener (born September 20, 1988) is a former American football tight end. After playing at Joliet Catholic Academy during high school, Fleener played college football at Stanford University. He was drafted by the Indianapolis Colts in the second round of the 2012 NFL Draft. He has also played for the New Orleans Saints.

College career

Fleener played college football for the Stanford Cardinal from 2008 to 2011. In his collegiate career, he recorded 96 receptions for 1,543 yards and 18 touchdowns. He was named an All-American by CBSSports.com as a senior in 2011.

Professional career

Fleener was considered a top tight end prospect for the 2012 NFL Draft. At the NFL combine, he benched 27 reps of 225 at 6-6 247, though he did not run because of an ankle injury.

Indianapolis Colts
The Indianapolis Colts selected Fleener in the second round with the 34th overall pick in the 2012 NFL Draft after drafting his college quarterback, Andrew Luck, with the 1st overall pick. Fleener was the first tight end drafted in the 2012 NFL Draft. On July 25, he and the Colts agreed to a four-year contract worth $5.431 million.

Fleener made his regular season debut in Week 1 against the Chicago Bears, recording six receptions for 82 yards. He struggled through the early season, before recording his first career touchdown reception against the Detroit Lions in Week 13. Fleener finished the 2012 regular season with 26 receptions for 281 yards and two touchdowns. He recorded three receptions for 25 yards in the Colts' 24–9 Wild Card loss to the eventual Super Bowl XLVII champion Baltimore Ravens.

Fleener began the 2013 preseason as the backup to Dwayne Allen. He missed the final two weeks of preseason after suffering a knee injury. Allen would be placed on injured reserve after Week 1, making Fleener the starter for the rest of the season. He recorded his first career 100-yard receiving game in Week 11 against the Tennessee Titans, making eight receptions for 107 yards. Fleener finished the 2013 season with 52 receptions for 608 yards and four touchdowns. In the Colts' Wild Card playoff game against the Kansas City Chiefs, he had five receptions for 46 yards and a touchdown to assist in the Colts' 45–44 comeback win.

New Orleans Saints
On March 9, 2016, Fleener signed a five-year, $36 million contract with the New Orleans Saints. He finished the 2016 season with 50 receptions for 631 yards and three touchdowns. In addition, Fleener scored his first career rushing touchdown, on his first career rushing attempt, in a Week 6 victory over the Carolina Panthers.

On September 11, 2017, in the season opener against the Minnesota Vikings on Monday Night Football, Fleener had five receptions for 54 yards and a touchdown. He was placed on injured reserve on December 2, after suffering a concussion in Week 12. On May 7, 2018, Fleener was released by the Saints.

NFL career statistics

Regular season

Postseason

References

External links

 Stanford Cardinal bio
 Indianapolis Colts bio
 New Orleans Saints bio

1988 births
Living people
People from Lemont, Illinois
Sportspeople from Cook County, Illinois
Sportspeople from DuPage County, Illinois
Players of American football from Illinois
American football tight ends
Stanford Cardinal football players
Indianapolis Colts players
New Orleans Saints players